Muriel Evans (born Muriel Adele Evanson; July 20, 1910 – October 26, 2000) was an American film actress.  She is best known for her many appearances in popular westerns of the 1930s for which she won a Golden Boot Award.

Early life and career
Evans was born in Minneapolis, Minnesota to Norwegian immigrant parents. Her father died when she was only two months old, forcing her mother to move to California to find work, where Evans' mother took a job as a maid at First National Studios. She spent her afternoons on film sets and was soon noticed by a studio executive. The executive introduced her to the director Robert Z. Leonard, who gave her a small role opposite Corinne Griffith in the 1926 film, Mademoiselle Modiste. She continued attending classes at Hollywood High School and landing bit parts in stock theater productions and silent films.

In 1929, Evans co-starred in the silent, comedic short films, Good Night Nurse and Joyland, starring Lupino Lane. Shortly after completing Joyland, Evans put her acting career on hold to finish school. In July 1929, Evans announced her engagement to Michael J. P. Cudahy, the grandson of Michael Cudahy, one of the founders of the Cudahy Packing Company. They were married on July 7, 1929 in Riverside, California. Evans and Cudahy traveled the world and settled in Paris. In 1930, they returned to the United States and Evans filed for divorce. Their divorce was finalized in October 1930. Evans, who gave up her career upon her marriage, returned to Hollywood, signed a contract at MGM and began making films again.

In March 1932, Evans (and 11 other actresses) won a two-day beauty contest sponsored by Paramount Pictures, after which she starred in six films, most notably Young Ironsides with Charley Chase and Pack Up Your Troubles with Laurel and Hardy. She would go on to star in eight more shorts with Chase before his death in 1940.

Evans' success was due in large part to her pleasant speaking voice. She made a smooth transition from silent pictures to talkies, and throughout the 1930s, Evans continued to work steadily. She appeared in Frank Capra's Mr. Deeds Goes to Town, Manhattan Melodrama with Clark Gable and William Powell, and The Prizefighter and the Lady with Myrna Loy. By the mid-1930s, Evans also began co-starring in popular westerns alongside Tom Mix, John Wayne and Tex Ritter. She also starred in three Hopalong Cassidy films opposite William Boyd, and did seven westerns with Buck Jones.

Later years

In 1936, Evans married a theatrical agent, Marshall R. Worcester. By age 30, she retired from acting. One of her last film appearances came in 1946, in the Pete Smith short, Studio Visit. Soon after retiring, Evans and her husband settled in Washington, D.C. Over the next decade, she starred in four radio shows and in the television show Hollywood Reporter. In 1951, the couple moved back to Hollywood, although Evans never resumed her acting career. Eventually, the couple bought property in Tarzana, California, where Evans dabbled in real estate.

After the death of her husband in 1971, Evans began work as a volunteer nurse at the Motion Picture and Television Country House and Hospital in Woodland Hills not far from her home. After a stroke in 1994, she became a resident within the complex and often dined with fellow actors with whom she had once worked, including Anita Garvin. In 1999, Evans made her last film appearance in a 2000 documentary, I Used to Be in Pictures, in which she was one of many former actors who recalled their experiences in the film work.

Death
On October 26, 2000, Muriel Evans died of colon cancer at the Motion Picture and Television Country House and Hospital in Woodland Hills, California. She was 90 years old.

Filmography

References

External links

 
 

1910 births
2000 deaths
20th-century American actresses
American film actresses
American people of Norwegian descent
American radio actresses
American silent film actresses
American stage actresses
Deaths from cancer in California
Deaths from colorectal cancer
Hollywood High School alumni
Actresses from Minneapolis
Western (genre) film actresses